Sir George Alexander Touche, 1st Baronet (24 May 1861 – 7 July 1935), born George Alexander Touch (he added the final "e" in 1906 because people continually mispronounced his name), was a British accountant and politician. He founded one of the firms which amalgamated to create Deloitte Touche Tohmatsu.

Early life and career
Touche was born on 24 May 1861 in Edinburgh, the son of a banker. He was educated at the Bonnington Academy, the Edinburgh Institution, and the University of Edinburgh and was indentured to a chartered accountant in 1878. In 1883 he was admitted to the Society of Accountants in Edinburgh and immediately left for London, joining the firm of Broads, Patterson & May.

Later career
In 1889 he was appointed first secretary of the Industrial and General Trust, later becoming manager, director in 1898, and chairman in 1908. He also became director and chairman of many other companies. In 1899 he founded his own practice, George A. Touch & Co.

In 1910 he was elected as the Conservative Member of Parliament for North Islington, but retired due to ill-health in 1918.

He was knighted in 1917 and created a baronet for his political services in the 1920 Birthday Honours.

He died on 7 July 1935.

Footnotes

References
Biography, Oxford Dictionary of National Biography

External links
 

British accountants
Conservative Party (UK) MPs for English constituencies
UK MPs 1910–1918
Politicians from Edinburgh
People educated at Stewart's Melville College
Alumni of the University of Edinburgh
Baronets in the Baronetage of the United Kingdom
Knights Bachelor
1861 births
1935 deaths
Deloitte people
Businesspeople from Edinburgh